Hundige is a suburb  southwest of Copenhagen in Greve Municipality. The suburb was originally a small town, but redeveloped into a suburb in the 1960s. The suburb was connected to Copenhagen's S-train network in 1976.

Crime 
The suburb has a relatively high rate of crime, most of which are committed in the large housing project called Askerød in the northern part of the suburb. Askerød is a concrete housing project made up of 3-4 story concrete buildings  containing a total of 722 apartments. The area is often portrayed as an immigrant ghetto by the Danish media. The majority of people living in "Askerød" are first and second generation immigrants, most of whom are under the age of 18.

The housing project called Gersagerparken has also been known for criminal activity including Drive-by shooting as the project was the previous home of the Black Cobra gang, before the gang moved to the town Ishøj and Karlslunde. Gersagerparken has seen a decrease in criminal activity since then, the most notable criminal activity being a raid on a potential bombs producer.

Shopping center 

The Hundige StorCenter, a large shopping mall, was built in 1974. Since re-opening in 2009, the shopping center has been called Waves. It is the largest mall in Denmark by leasable space with approximately 78,000 m2. The mall houses the third largest Bilka in Denmark and has more than 135 stores and restaurants. The mall has 3,200 free parking lots as shopping in the mall is mainly car based. The mall employs more than 1,500 people making it the largest employer in Greve Municipality.

Notable people 
 Bodil Joensen (1944 in Hundige – 1985), a Danish pornographic actress.
 Lars Ankerstjerne Christensen (born 1984 in Hundige), a Danish rapper and songwriter.
 DB King, a Danish rapper and songwriter.
 Ghali, a Danish rapper and songwriter.
 Sleiman (born 1982 in Lebanon, raised in Hundige), a Danish rapper and songwriter known for his criminal past and affiliation to the local gang Bloodz. 
 Theresa (Tessa) Ann Fallesen, a Danish rapper and songwriter.
 Ricki Olsen (born 1988 in Hundige), a Danish football player with 250 club caps.
 Mai Surrow (born 1992), a Danish badminton player, lives in Hundige.

References
Neighbourhoods in Denmark
Greve Municipality